Bauer & Cie. v. O'Donnell, 229 U.S. 1 (1913), was a 1913 United States Supreme Court decision involving whether a purchaser of a patented product bearing a price-fixing notice incurs guilt of patent infringement by reselling the product at a price lower than that which the notice commands. A divided Court (5–4) held that it was not.

Bauer & Cie, a German company, was the assignee of U.S. Patent No. 601,995, covering Sanatogen, a water-soluble drug product (patent medicine), advertised as the "King of Tonics" and a strength-giving "concentrated scientific food." Bauer sold the patented product in the United States through its exclusive sales agent, Hehmeyer, under a license agreement. Sanatogen was sold with this notice on each bag:

O'Donnell, a retail druggist in Washington, DC, purchased Sanatogen at wholesale and resold the Sanatogen for less than $1. He persisted in doing this and was cut off, but he managed to continue to purchase the product from jobbers in DC "and avers that he will continue such sales." This led to the present patent infringement suit. The Court of Appeals of the District of Columbia certified the case to the Supreme Court with this question:

Ruling of Supreme Court

Justice William R. Day delivered the majority opinion, joined by Justices White, Hughes, Lamar, Pitney. Justices McKenna, Holmes, Lurton, and Van Devanter dissented without opinion.

The Court restated the question before it as:

The patentee argued that the purpose of the restrictive notice was "to prevent ruinous competition by the cutting of prices in sales of the patented article." Day responded, however, that absent a patent the Court had held resale price fixing unlawful in Dr. Miles Medical Co. v. John D. Park & Sons Co. And Congress could, if it had wanted to, have conferred on patentees the right to impose such restrictions. He then asked:

In the Bobbs-Merrill case the Court held that the copyright was exhausted by the first sale, and:

The Court recognized that "there are differences between the copyright statute and the patent statute, and the purpose to decide the question now before us was expressly disclaimed" in Bobbs–Merrill. Nonetheless, "it is apparent that, in the respect involved in the present inquiry, there is a strong similarity between and identity of purpose in the two statutes." Both statutes grant an exclusive right to "vend." There is no difference of importance in the respective legal rights to vend books and vend products:

The patentee here insists that the purpose of notices fixing resale prices, specifically "keeping up prices and preventing competition"—is more essential to the protection of patented goods than of copyrighted books. Congress intended to provide "[p}rotection in the exclusive right to sell . . . in both instances, and the terms used in the statutes are to all intents the same."

The only significant difference is that patent law gives an exclusive right to use and copyright law does not. The Supreme Court decision involving a post-sale restraint on which the patentee places chief reliance here is Henry v. A.B. Dick Co. But that decision was based on the exclusive use right:

Here, the patentee has argued "that the notice in this case deals with the use of the invention, because the notice states that the package is licensed 'for sale and use at a price not less than $1,' [and] that a purchase is an acceptance of the conditions. . ." But, the Court insisted:

As in Bobbs-Merrill Co v. Straus, with copyright, the Court ruled, restrictions could not be extended beyond the terms of the statute, which grants an exclusive right to vend but grants no "privilege to keep up prices and prevent competition by notices restricting the price at which the article may be resold." When the right to vend is exercised, patent rights are exhausted:

Commentary

● A contemporary Note in the Michigan Law Review said the case "was of vital importance to a large number of manufacturers," as was "evidenced by the various ingenious methods and devices which have since been adopted by numerous manufacturers to avoid the operation and application of the principles set forth in the decision," such as leasing and agency. The writer was surprised that "The tendency of the Supreme Court seems to be to take the view that the monopoly enjoyed by the patentee was not meant by Congress to be without limitation, and consequently to make it practically impossible for the patentee to control the retail price."

The writer maintains: "This decision by the Supreme Court was unquestionably a very great surprise to many, as it is not only directly in conflict with an almost unbroken line of decisions of the inferior federal courts," beginning with the Button-Fastener case, and "it is also nearly impossible to reconcile this decision" with Henry v. A. B. Dick Co. As for the Dick case, the writer continues, "It was generally thought that in the Dick case the Supreme Court had expressly committed itself to the doctrine that the patentee could require the user to comply with any conditions which he might choose to impose." He considers the distinction drawn with that case to be flimsy and not "clear, sound, or convincing."

● A contemporary Note in the California Law Review also observed that in light of the A.B. Dick decision it was natural "that some slight surprise should be occasioned by the decision of the Supreme Court in the so-called Sanatogen case which holds that a patentee is without right to make or enforce a resale price stipulation." More accurately than the Michigan note, this note attributed the see-sawing in recent years to the changes in the personnel of a closely divided Court and successive replacements by new Roosevelt, Taft, and Wilson appointees:

● Granville Munson, in a 1917 article on post-sale restraints, found the A.B. Dick and Bauer cases irreconcilable: "It is submitted the Sanatogen case and the Dick case cannot both be upheld, although the court professes to distinguish the latter." He i9nsisted that the exclusive right to "vend" must include the right to set terms and conditions on which the patented article will be vended, and not just the right to sell or not sell: "If the word, "vend," is to have any particular meaning in the patent law, it is submitted it must be taken to refer to the conditions which may be imposed on subsales." Munson therefore concludes that "the decision in Bauer & Cie v. O'Donnell should not be supported."

● Charles Miller was critical of the Court's decision to suppress Bauer's resale price fixing:

He added:

See also
Arizona Cartridge Remanufacturers Association Inc. v. Lexmark International Inc.

References

External links
 
 

United States Supreme Court cases
United States Supreme Court cases of the White Court
United States patent case law
1913 in United States case law
United States copyright case law
United States misuse law